Wariyapola Sri Sumangala College is a boys' school in Kandy, Sri Lanka

History 
The school - one of the oldest in Kandy - was established as St. Paul's College, a junior school branch of Trinity College, Kandy. It was renamed St Paul's English School in 1987. In 1992 the school was renamed to Wariyapola Sri Sumangala College and relocated to present site.

It has a cricket rivalry with Sri Rahula College.

See also 
 List of schools in Central Province, Sri Lanka

References 

Schools in Kandy District